Cañada College is a public community college in Redwood City, California. It is one of the smallest community colleges in the San Francisco Bay Area.

History 

In 1957, the San Mateo Junior College District Board of Trustees developed a 25-year district master plan based on the recommendations of a citizens' advisory committee, and the same year submitted a $5.9 million bond issue to voters that was approved by a three-to-one margin.

The bond issue victory cleared the way for prompt acquisition of the present College of San Mateo campus and also provided funds for purchase of a  site west of Skyline Boulevard and south of Sharp Park Road in San Bruno.

The current College of San Mateo campus was opened in 1963, followed by Cañada College in 1968, and Skyline College, San Bruno, in 1969. Construction of Cañada and Skyline was made possible in large part from proceeds from a second bond issue of $12.8 million approved by district voters in March, 1964.

Educational and architectural planning for Cañada was accomplished in 1964-66 and proceeded on the theory that a first phase for at least 2,000 students should be designed to permit expansion ultimately to 8,000 day students. Grading of the site began in 1966, and the building construction contract was awarded in April, 1967. The first classes – for 2,000 students – were held in September, 1968.

Cañada College is named after Cañada road that connects the college to Crystal Springs Reservoir to the North and Woodside, California to the South. The name Cañada is Spanish for a small canyon, glen, or ravine. The ravine is now filled with drinking water.

The total cost to build the campus was $12.2 million. The  of buildings cost  to build.

Academics 

The college offers more than 40 instructional programs under three instructional divisions: Business, Design & Workforce; Humanities & Social Sciences; and Science & Technology.

Cañada is a regional center for Science, Technology, Engineering, and Mathematics (STEM) education. Through its STEM focus, it has developed partnerships with the NASA and San Francisco State University.

The college has a number of programs to support underrepresented and economically disadvantaged students.

Sports
Cañada won state championships in men's tennis in 1977, 1978, 1982, 1983, and 1993. The school won a men's golf state championship in 1988.

The Women's golf team won the Central Conference Championship in 2008, 2010, 2011, 2012, and 2013. The also won the NorCal Championship in 2012 and 2013 and finished third at the state championship in 2012 and 2013.

Current sports offered at the college include baseball, men's basketball, women's golf, men's soccer, women's soccer, women's tennis, and women's volleyball.

Notable alumni

Moisés Alou, Major League Baseball player
Cara Black, author
Anna Eshoo, U.S. Representative, earned an associate degree from Cañada College in 1975 
 Bob Melvin (born 1961), Major League Baseball player and manager
Stevie Nicks (born 1948), singer-songwriter and part of the music group Fleetwood Mac, attended Cañada College in 1966-1967
Harold Reynolds (born 1960), Major League Baseball player and MLB Network sports analyst
Ken Rinaldo, installation artist working with technology and professor at Ohio State University, graduated from Cañada College in Computer Science

Notable faculty

 Lev Kirshner, soccer player and soccer coach

See also
 California Community Colleges system

References

External links

 

 
California Community Colleges
Educational institutions established in 1968
Schools accredited by the Western Association of Schools and Colleges
Universities and colleges in San Mateo County, California